Saint Herculanus of Brescia (died ca. 550 AD) was a bishop of Brescia.

References

External links
Herculanus of Brescia
 Herculanus von Brescia

Medieval Italian saints
Bishops of Brescia
550 deaths
6th-century Christian saints
6th-century Italian bishops
Year of birth unknown